There are at least 39 named lakes and reservoirs in Lee County, Arkansas.

Lakes
	Anderson Lake, el.  
	Bain Lake, el.  
	Big Twin Lake, el.  
	Big Yancopin Lake, el.  
	Blue Hole, el.  
	Blue Lake, el.  
	Box Lake, el.  
	Brushy Lake, el.  
	Cannon Lake, el.  
	Cannon Lake, el.  
	Dry Lake, el.  
	Ellison Lake, el.  
	Goose Lake, el.  
	Johnson Lake, el.  
	L'Anguille Lake, el.  
	Laddie Lake, el.  
	Larkin Lake, el.  
	Little Mossy Lake, el.  
	Little Twin Lake, el.  
	Little Yancopin Lake, el.  
	Long Lake, el.  
	Long Lake, el.  
	Long Lake, el.  
	McCloud Lake, el.  
	McNulty Lake, el.  
	Midway Lake, el.  
	Midway Lake, el.  
	Millseed Lake, el.  
	Mossy Lake, el.  
	Old River Lake, el.  
	Piney Fork Lake, el.  
	Round Pond, el.  
	Rowing Lake, el.  
	Shenship Lake, el.  
	Tunica Lake, el.  
	Walnut Lake, el.  
	Whistling Lake, el.

Reservoirs
	Bear Creek Lake, el.  
	Crystal Lake, el.

See also

 List of lakes in Arkansas

Notes

Bodies of water of Lee County, Arkansas
Lee